David Albert Scott (born June 27, 1945) is an American politician and businessman who has served as the U.S. representative for  since 2003. Scott's district includes the southern fourth of Atlanta, as well as several of its suburbs to the south and west. Before his election to Congress in 2002, Scott served as a Democratic member of both chambers of the Georgia Legislature and operated a small business. In 2007, the political watchdog group Citizens for Responsibility and Ethics in Washington named Scott one of the 25 most corrupt members of Congress. In 2023, he succeeded Glenn Thompson as ranking member of the House Agriculture Committee.

Early life and education
Scott was born in Aynor, South Carolina, and attended high school in Daytona Beach, Florida. He received a bachelor's degree in finance from Florida A&M University and a Master of Business Administration from the Wharton School of the University of Pennsylvania. Scott is a member of Alpha Phi Alpha fraternity.

Early career 
In 1978, Scott founded Dayn-Mark Advertising (from the names of his two daughters, Dayna and Marcie), which places billboards and other forms of advertising in the Atlanta area. Scott's wife, Alfredia, now heads the business. In May 2007, it was reported that the business owed more than $150,000 in back taxes and penalties. Scott's campaigns paid the company more than $500,000 from 2002 to 2010, including expenses for office rent, printing, T-shirts, and other services. He has also paid his wife, two daughters, and son-in-law tens of thousands of dollars for campaign work such as fund raising and canvassing. In 2007, Scott was named one of the 25 most corrupt members of Congress by the political watchdog group Citizens for Responsibility and Ethics in Washington.

Scott served in the Georgia House of Representatives from 1974 to 1982 and in the Georgia State Senate from 1982 to 2002.

U.S. House of Representatives
When Georgia picked up an additional district as a result of the 2000 census, Scott entered a five-way Democratic primary for the seat, winning with 53.8% of the vote. He then defeated Republican Clay Cox in the general election with 59% of the vote. He has never faced another contest that close, and has been reelected eight times, running unopposed in 2004, 2014 and 2016.

During his first two terms, Scott represented a district that twisted and wound its way through parts of nine counties and was barely contiguous in some areas. In a mid-decade redistricting held after the 2004 elections, the district was redrawn to be somewhat more compact, with its population centered in Clayton, Douglas and Fulton Counties. Redistricting after the 2010 census gave the district all of Douglas County and pushed it further into Clayton.

Committee assignments
Committee on Agriculture  (Ranking Member)
Subcommittee on General Farm Commodities and Risk Management
Subcommittee on Livestock, Dairy, and Poultry
Committee on Financial Services
Subcommittee on Consumer Protection and Financial Institutions
Subcommittee on Investor Protection, Entrepreneurship and Capital Markets
NATO Parliamentary Assembly

Caucus memberships
Blue Dog Coalition (left in 2023) 
New Democrat Coalition
Congressional Black Caucus 
U.S.-Japan Caucus

Party leadership
Co-Chair of the Democratic Study Group on National Security

Scott was the lead sponsor on the following legislation:
 The Financial Literacy Act, to provide education to investors and home buyers
 The Access to Healthcare Insurance Act, extending affordable healthcare coverage
 The Extension for Unemployment Benefits and the Overtime Pay Protection Acts
 The Moment of Silence Act, for reflection or prayer at the start of each school day in the nation's public schools
 The Retired Pay Restoration Act, giving veterans both retirement and disability pay
 The Zero Down Payment Act, which eliminates the down payment requirement for middle and low income families who buy homes with a FHA insured mortgages
 The Mutual Fund Integrity Act, which strengthens regulations of the stock market

Political positions
Scott was ranked as the 18th most bipartisan member of the U.S. House of Representatives during the 114th United States Congress (and the second most bipartisan member of the U.S. House of Representatives from Georgia) in the Bipartisan Index created by The Lugar Center and the McCourt School of Public Policy, which ranks members of the United States Congress by their degree of bipartisanship by measuring how often each member's bills attract co-sponsors from the opposite party and each member co-sponsors bills by members of the opposite party.

Online gambling
Scott is a staunch advocate of a federal prohibition of online poker. In 2006, he cosponsored H.R. 4777, the Internet Gambling Prohibition Act, and voted for H.R. 4411, the Goodlatte-Leach Internet Gambling Prohibition Act. In 2008, he opposed H.R. 5767, the Payment Systems Protection Act (a bill that sought to place a moratorium on enforcement of the Unlawful Internet Gambling Enforcement Act while the U.S. Treasury Department and the Federal Reserve defined "unlawful Internet gambling").

Affordable Care Act
Scott voted for the Affordable Care Act (Obamacare). On August 6, 2009, he was confronted by a constituent who was also a local doctor. The doctor, who later appeared in subsequent debates with his opposition candidate, asked Scott why he was going to vote for a health care plan similar to the plan implemented in Massachusetts and whether he supported a government-provided health care insurance option. Scott questioned whether the doctor was a resident of his district, although the local TV station WXIA-TV confirmed that the doctor did live and work in the district. Scott also said the doctor had not called Scott's office to set up a meeting about health care; this was not verified.

Fiscal policy
Although Scott voted against the first version of the 2008 bailout, he backed the final version "after being assured the legislation would aid homeowners facing foreclosures. Scott crafted an added provision dedicating $14 billion to aid those homeowners."

Same-sex marriage
Scott supported two failed pieces of legislation in 2004 and 2006 that aimed to establish a constitutional amendment banning same-sex marriage. However, in May 2013 thinkprogress.org reported receiving an email from a spokesman of Scott saying, "Congressman Scott fully supports marriage equality." The Human Rights Campaign's profile of Scott also contains this sentence as his statement under "position on marriage equality".

Iran deal
Scott has announced his opposition to the nuclear deal with Iran, saying, "It’s a good deal for Iran, for Russia, China and probably Hezbollah, but is it not, definitely not a good deal for Israel or for the United States or our allies – especially Jordan and Saudi Arabia".

Yemeni civil war 
Scott was one of five House Democrats to vote for the U.S. to continue selling arms to Saudi Arabia and to support the Saudi Arabian-led intervention in Yemen. This vote was cast the day after the Senate, on December 13, 2018, for the first time in the 45 years after the passage of the War Powers Resolution in 1973, came together and used congressional authority given by federal law to end military action.

Personal life

Scott's brother-in-law was Baseball Hall of Fame member Hank Aaron.

Scott allegedly received death threats over his support of the Affordable Care Act. A swastika was found spray-painted on a sign outside his district office.

See also
List of African-American United States representatives

References

External links

Congressman David Scott official U.S. House website
David Scott for Congress

|-

|-

1946 births
21st-century American politicians
African-American members of the United States House of Representatives
African-American state legislators in Georgia (U.S. state)
Baptists from Georgia (U.S. state)
Baptists from the United States
Democratic Party members of the United States House of Representatives from Georgia (U.S. state)
Florida A&M University alumni
Democratic Party Georgia (U.S. state) state senators
Living people
Democratic Party members of the Georgia House of Representatives
People from Aynor, South Carolina
Politicians from Atlanta
Wharton School of the University of Pennsylvania alumni
Baptists from South Carolina
21st-century African-American politicians